Ceramic building material, often abbreviated to CBM, is an umbrella term used in archaeology to cover all building materials made from baked clay. It is particularly, but not exclusively, used in relation to Roman building materials. 

It is a useful and necessary term because, especially when initially found in archaeological excavation, it may be difficult to distinguish, for example, fragments of bricks from fragments of roofing or flooring tiles. However, ceramic building materials are usually readily distinguishable from fragments of ceramic pottery by their rougher finish.

See also

Further reading

External links
Current Archaeology Archaeological Ceramic Building Materials Group
South Oxfordshire Archaeological Group Ceramic Building Material Recording (Introduction)

Archaeological artefact types
Ceramic materials
Soil-based building materials
Bricks